Center Township is an inactive township in St. Clair County, in the U.S. state of Missouri.

Center Township was erected in ca. 1890, and named for the fact the geographical center of St. Clair County lies within its borders.

References

Townships in Missouri
Townships in St. Clair County, Missouri